James Donald (1 June 1895 – 4 May 1976) was a member of the Queensland Legislative Assembly.

Early years
Donald was born at Redbank, Queensland, to parents Andrew Donald and his wife Jessie (née Simpson) and was educated at Redbank State School and Ipswich State School. He then began an apprenticeship as a cabinetmaker, attending Ipswich Technical College before entering the mining industry as a winding engine driver. It was this job that led to a long association with Queensland Colliery Employees Union where he started out as a union organizer and was vice president several times in the 1940s.

Political career
When the member for Bremer, former Premier Frank Cooper, retired from politics in March 1946, Donald was chosen by the Labor Party to be their candidate at the by-election which was held on the 25 May 1946. Donald went on to win the seat over the Queensland People's Party candidate, Harold Shapcott, by 5643 votes to 3246.

Donald held Bremer until the seat was abolished prior to the 1960 state election when he moved to the newly created seat of Ipswich East which he went on to hold from 1960 until his retirement from politics in 1969.

Although Donald was in parliament for 23 years, he was never appointed to the ministry, almost certainly due to having refused to support a bill introduced by the Labor Party concerning miners' pensions and entitlements. He was, however, secretary of the State Parliamentary Party for 21 years; and when the leader of the opposition, Les Wood, unexpectedly died in 1958, Donald became the new opposition leader on the 14 April of that year. He stood aside from the position to make way for Jack Duggan on 17 August 1958, after Duggan had won the seat of North Toowoomba in the by-election necessitated by Wood's death.

Donald in effect was interim leader between Wood's death and Duggan's return.

During his political career, Donald earned a reputation as one of the most modest and unassuming gentlemen ever to serve in the Parliament. He had a very quiet manner of debate, which was always well backed up by a great deal of preparation and research. In addition he was an advocate of temperance, on which his views were rigid and uncompromising.

Personal life
Donald married Mary Jane Dobbie on the 27 September 1916 and together had one son and one daughter. Mary died in 1955, and on the 11 July 1960 he married Hilda Bell Julho Thomlinson (died 1984). Donald was interested in cricket, football, tennis and bowls, and was a  representative on the Ipswich Cricket and Rugby League associations.

Donald died in May 1976 and was cremated. His ashes are in the Columbarium at Ipswich General Cemetery.

References

Members of the Queensland Legislative Assembly
1895 births
1976 deaths
Australian Labor Party members of the Parliament of Queensland
Burials at Ipswich General Cemetery
People from Ipswich, Queensland
20th-century Australian politicians